The English industrial metal band Godflesh have released eight studio albums and six extended plays along with a number of singles, compilations and remix and live albums. The group formed in 1982 under the name Fall of Because, but they did not release any music (outside of a 1986 demo tape titled Extirpate) until 1988 when Justin Broadrick and B. C. Green changed the project's name to Godflesh and recorded a self-titled debut EP. That EP, released through the independent label Swordfish, was met with underground success and has since been recognised as one of the first industrial metal releases, if not the first.

Though the self-titled EP acted as Godflesh's introduction to innovation and experimentation, their next release and first through Earache Records, 1989's Streetcleaner, garnered even more recognition for its musical importance. After the success of Streetcleaner, Godflesh recorded Pure in 1992, which has drawn retrospective recognition as a significant release in the post-metal genre. The band's third album, Selfless (1994), was Godflesh's debut on Columbia Records. The album sold under expectations, and that coupled with MTV banning the music video of its lead single, "Crush My Soul", led to Columbia dropping support of Godflesh. Regardless of the disappointing commercial performance of Selfless, Broadrick considers that album and all of the preceding releases as Godflesh's best material.

In 1996, Godflesh, back on Earache, released Songs of Love and Hate, which featured Bryan Mantia on drums; this was a significant departure from the band's characteristic style, since all of their previous releases had been structured around programmed industrial beats from a drum machine. Broadrick later described this shift as a dilution of Godflesh's original goal, which was to meld human and machine music. Love and Hate in Dub, a remix album released in 1997, saw Godflesh again experimenting, this time with hip hop, breakbeats and dub. Those experiments continued and heightened with the 1999 studio album Us and Them, which again featured machine percussion. After Us and Them proved creatively dissatisfying for Broadrick, the band found a new live drummer (this time in Ted Parsons). Hymns (2001) was recorded in a professional studio, which led to a great deal of frustration for the band. Shortly after Hymns''' release, Green quit Godflesh, and Broadrick officially ended the band not long after that.

Godflesh reformed in 2010 as Broadrick and Green. After performing scattered shows for four years, the band's return album, A World Lit Only by Fire (2014), was released to critical acclaim and appeared on several critics' year-end lists. It was a notably heavy industrial metal album focused again on downtuned guitar, distorted bass and driving machine drums. In 2017, Godflesh's eighth album, Post Self, was released. Like A World Lit Only by Fire, it drew critical praise and award recognition; unlike that previous album, however, Post Self'' proved introspective and experimental. Despite regular acclaim from critics and fellow musicians, Godflesh have received only minor commercial success.

Albums

Studio albums

Extended plays

Remix albums

Compilation albums

Live albums

Singles

References

External links
 Godflesh on Bandcamp through Avalanche Recordings (2003–present)
 Godflesh on Bandcamp through Earache Records (1988–2001)
 Godflesh discography on fan-managed website in operation since 1998
 Godflesh on Discogs

Discography
Discographies of British artists